The Sample and Data Relationship Format (SDRF) is part of the MAGE-TAB standard for communicating the results
of microarray investigations, including all information required for MIAME compliance.

An SDRF file is a tab-delimited file describing the relationships between samples, arrays, data, and other objects used or produced in a microarray investigation.

For simple experimental designs, constructing the SDRF file is straightforward, and even complex loop designs can be expressed in this format.

References

External links
 MAGE-TAB — FGED (formerly MGED) Society
 Sample and Data Relationship Format — U. S. National Cancer Institute's wiki

Minimum Information Standards
Microarrays